Saruq Rural District is a rural district (dehestan) in Saruq District, Farahan County, Markazi Province, Iran. At the 2006 census, its population was 8,410, in 2,234 families. The rural district has 15 villages.

References 

Rural Districts of Markazi Province
Farahan County